Marnus Labuschagne ( or ; born 22 June 1994) is a South African born, Australian international cricketer who plays for the Australian cricket team in Tests and ODIs as a batter. He plays domestically for Queensland in Australian domestic cricket, Glamorgan in county cricket and for Brisbane Heat in the Big Bash League. As of February 2023, Labuschagne is #1 in the ICC Test batting rankings.

In August 2019, Labuschagne was the first cricketer to become a concussion substitute in a Cricket Test match, replacing Steve Smith. Labuschagne was the leading run-scorer in Test matches in 2019. He rose to fourth place in the ICC Player Rankings during the year, a rise of 106 places. In January 2020, Labuschagne was named as the ICC Men's Emerging Cricketer of the Year by the International Cricket Council (ICC), in February as Australia's Test player of the year, and in April as one of the five Cricketers of the Year by Wisden Cricketers' Almanack.

Early life
Labuschagne was born in Klerksdorp, in South Africa's North West province, to South African parents. His family emigrated to Australia in 2004 when he was 10, after his father gained work in the mining industry, and Labuschagne attended school at Brisbane State High School. He grew up speaking Afrikaans, and only became fluent in English after moving to Australia. In 2021, he revealed that in November 2010, he worked at The Gabba, Brisbane, as a Hot Spot infrared camera operator for Channel 9, and witnessed Peter Siddle's hat-trick during the 2010–11 Ashes series, on Siddle's 26th birthday.

Domestic career
A right-handed batsman, Labuschagne played for Queensland at under-12, under-15, under-17, and under-19 level, and captained the side at the 2012–13 National Championships. In Brisbane Grade Cricket, he plays for Easts-Redlands District Cricket Club. He spent 2013 playing club cricket in England for Plymouth in the Devon Premier League and played for Sandwich Town Cricket Club in the Kent Premier League in 2014, scoring prolifically for both sides.

After playing just once for Queensland Academy, Labuschagne made his first-class cricket debut in the first round of the 2014–15 Sheffield Shield season against South Australia at the Adelaide Oval. Opening the batting with Joe Burns, he scored 83 runs in Queensland's first innings, featuring in a 99-run fourth-wicket partnership with Nick Stevens. Later in the 2014–15 season, Labuschagne was used as a substitute fielder for the Australian national side in the second Test against India at the Gabba, taking a low catch at short leg.

Labuschagne made his List A debut for Queensland in the 2015 One-Day Cup in October 2015 and scored his maiden first-class century in the following month, making 112 runs in his eighth Sheffield Shield match. He scored 273 runs at a batting average of 45 in the 2016 One-Day Cup and was named player of the tournament.

In September 2017, during a 2017 One-Day Cup match between Queensland and Cricket Australia XI, he became the first fielder to be penalised under the newly introduced Law designed to stop fielders deceiving batsmen. Labuschagne dived to field a ball in the covers, and although he failed to stop the ball he feigned throwing to the wicket-keeper. His team was penalised five runs.

After being Queensland's leading run-scorer in the 2017–18 Sheffield Shield, Cricket Australia named him in their Sheffield Shield team of the season.

County cricket
In April 2019, Labuschagne signed for Glamorgan County Cricket Club for the 2019 English cricket season. He made 1,114 runs in his first County Championship season, including three centuries in his first four first-class matches - one of which was a then career-best 182 against Sussex in a Glamorgan record second-wicket partnership of 291. He was the second-highest scorer in the Second Division of the County Championship, despite only playing in ten matches, and topped Glamorgan's batting averages with an average of 61.89 runs per innings. He also took 19 wickets with a bowling average of 38.11. In November 2019, he re-signed for Glamorgan for the next two seasons following his performances in the 2019 Ashes.

In June 2020, Labuschagne's contract was extended for an extra season following the disruption of the 2020 season due to the COVID-19 pandemic.

International career

Tour of UAE against Pakistan 2018–19 

In September 2018, he was named in Australia's Test squad for their series against Pakistan. He made his Test debut for Australia against Pakistan on 7 October 2018, scoring a two-ball duck in his first innings and 13 runs in his second. He also took two wickets on debut. He had his baggy green cap presented by Michael Hussey. In the second Test, he took another five wickets and made scores of 25 and 43, top scoring in Australia's second innings.

India and Sri Lanka in Australia 2018–19 

Marnus was named in the Australian One Day International squad in December 2018 ahead of the team's tour of India the following year before he was surprisingly added to the Australian Test squad for the fourth Test match against the touring Indians at the start of the year. He was selected to bat at number three in the batting order, a decision which was "heavily criticised" at the time. He scored 38 runs in his only innings and was retained in the side for the two Tests against Sri Lanka at the end of the summer.

Ashes in England 2019 

After showing good early season form for Glamorgan in county cricket, he was named in Australia's squad for the 2019 Ashes series in England. On 18 August 2019, Labuschagne replaced Steve Smith on day five of the second Test, after Smith suffered a concussion on the previous day – becoming the first player to be concussion substitute in a Test match following a change in the International Cricket Council's (ICC) regulations. Players substituted in this way are intended to be a "like for like" replacement, a role he "took very seriously". He went on to score 59 runs, the highest in the Australian second innings, and was selected for the third Test in Smith's absence, top-scoring in both Australian innings, batting in a style which was described as "exceptionally doughty, brave and intelligent batting". After England were bowled out for 67 in their first innings, Labuschagne became the fifth batsman in Test history to make two scores in a match higher than the total scored by the opposing team in one of their innings.

Pakistan and New Zealand in Australia 2019–20 

Labuschagne retained his place in the Australian side for the visit of Pakistan the following summer, scoring 185, his maiden Test century, at the Gabba. He scored another century in the second Test before scoring a third in the first Test against New Zealand in December. Having made three consecutive centuries, he made half-centuries in his next two innings before starting 2020 by making his first double-century in the third Test against New Zealand at the SCG, scoring 215 runs. He finished 2019 as the year's highest Test match run-scorer, having made 975 of his 1,104 Test runs in the year after his appearance as a concussion substitute in August. During the year he rose 106 places to become the fourth-ranked batsman on the ICC rankings.

Tours of India and South Africa 2019–20 

In December 2019, Labuschagne was named in Australia's ODI squad for their 2020 tour of India. He made his ODI debut on 14 January; Australia won the match by ten wickets with Labuschagne not batting or bowling in the game. He played the remaining two ODIs of the series, scoring a maiden ODI half-century in the third match.

After being retained in the Australian squad for their tour of South Africa, he scored his first ODI century in March, making 108 runs at Potchefstroom, close to his hometown. In April 2020, Cricket Australia awarded Labuschagne with a central contract ahead of the 2020–21 season. On 16 July 2020, Labuschagne was named in a 26-man preliminary squad of players to begin training ahead of a possible tour to England following the COVID-19 pandemic. On 14 August 2020, Cricket Australia confirmed that the fixtures would be taking place, with Labuschagne included in the touring party.

New Zealand in Australia 2020 

New Zealand returned to Australia after the Test series, with games scheduled to be held on the 13th, 15th and 20 March 2020. The first match was won by Australia, with a winning margin of 71 runs as Labuschagne made 56. However, due to the COVID-19 pandemic, the 2nd and 3rd matches were cancelled without a ball being bowled due to travel restrictions.

In February 2022, Labuschagne was named in Australia's Twenty20 International (T20I) squad for their one-off match against Pakistan. He made his T20I debut on 5 April 2022, for Australia against Pakistan.

Test Records 
In December 2022, on West Indies tour of Australia, Labuschagne achieved the 3000-run landmark and became the joint second-fastest batter to achieve this feat. He took 51 innings to accomplished the landmark, equalling with West Indies's batter Everton Weekes.

Achievements
 In the annual ICC Awards in January 2022, Labuschagne was included in ICC Men's Test Team of the Year for the year 2021.

Personal life 
Labuschagne married his wife, Rebekah, on 26 May 2017. Their first child, a daughter, Hallie was born on 20 September 2022. They have a chocolate Labrador named 'Milo' who has been known to make appearances on Labuschagne's Instagram playing backyard cricket.
 	
Labuschagne was brought up in a Christian household and committed to the faith aged 17. On his faith, Labuschagne says, "Sport is a fickle game and injuries play a big part. In the big scheme of things, what you're worth, what you put your value in, isn't out there on the pitch; it's internal and in Christ... cricket is always going to be up and down and if you have [Jesus Christ as] a constant in your life, it makes life a lot easier."

Labuschagne has a strong love for coffee, having completed a barista course at the age of 21. Marnus has been known to take his commercial grade coffee machine away on tour with the Australian Cricket Team. On the tour to Pakistan, Marnus also took 30 kg of coffee beans and 1000L of oat milk for the team.

Away from the field, Labuschagne has been known to hone his batting skills with home-made games in his backyard. In preparation for the 2022 Australian tour of Pakistan, he was seen practising batting on his home balcony in Brisbane on a rubber mat laden with pieces of taped aluminium and metal sheeting to try to emulate the variable bounce and turn of Pakistani wickets.

International centuries
, Labuschagne has scored 10 centuries in Test matches and one in an ODI.

References

External links

1994 births
Afrikaans-speaking people
Australian cricketers
Australia Test cricketers
Australia One Day International cricketers
Cricketers from Brisbane
Living people
People from Klerksdorp
South African people of Afrikaner descent
Queensland cricketers
South African emigrants to Australia
Brisbane Heat cricketers
People educated at Brisbane State High School
Australian Christians
Wisden Cricketers of the Year
Australian people of Afrikaner descent
Naturalised citizens of Australia
Australia Twenty20 International cricketers
Australian people of South African descent